Manzanares is a municipality of Spain located in the Province of Ciudad Real, Castilla–La Mancha. It had a population of 18,924 as of 2014. It is located near the Autovía A-4 (Autovia del Sur).

The Iglesia de la Asunción, the town's main church is dedicated to the Assumption of Mary.

The village of Llanos del Caudillo, established by the Instituto Nacional de Colonización in the 1950s and formerly depending from Manzanares, became a municipality in its own right in the 1990s.

References

External links

Manzanares - Castile-La Mancha Tourism

Municipalities in the Province of Ciudad Real